Mikhail Gerasimov  may refer to:
Mikhail Gerasimov (poet) (1889–1939)
Mikhail Mikhaylovich Gerasimov (1907–1970), Soviet archaeologist and anthropologist